East Side Historic District may refer to:

East Side Historic District (Longmont, Colorado), listed on the National Register of Historic Places in Boulder County, Colorado
 East Side Historic District (Kalispell, Montana), listed on the National Register of Historic Places in Flathead County, Montana
 East Side Historic District (Catskill, New York), listed on the National Register of Historic Places in Greene County, New York
 East Side Historic District (Saratoga Springs, New York), listed on the National Register of Historic Places in Saratoga County, New York
East Side Historic District (Bryan, Texas), listed on the National Register of Historic Places in Brazos County, Texas
East Side Historic District (Stoughton, Wisconsin), listed on the National Register of Historic Places in Dane County, Wisconsin
Near East Side Historic District, listed on the National Register of Historic Places in Rock County, Wisconsin